Little Dunmow is a village situated in rural Essex, England, in the vale of the River Chelmer about  east-southeast of the town of Great Dunmow. It can be reached from the Dunmow South exit of the A120 by following the road towards Braintree (B1256) for 3.2 km before turning right for the village. The centre of the old village, which has just 99 dwellings, is a further 0.6 km along the road. The Flitch Way, a linear country park along the route of the old Braintree to Bishop's Stortford railway, links Little Dunmow and the new settlement of Flitch Green. The new village, built on the site of a former sugar beet factory, is a self-contained community of 850 dwellings and is another kilometre along the road towards Felsted.

History

Feudal Barony
Little Dunmow formed the caput of a feudal barony the first holder of which was Ralph Baynard, as recorded in the Domesday Book of 1086.  

He was the builder of Baynard's Castle in the City of London and was followed by his son Geoffrey, whose son William rebelled against King Henry I (1100–1135) and thereby forfeited his lands. The barony was re-granted by the king to Robert FitzRichard (d.1134/6), younger son of Richard FitzGilbert de Clare (d.1091), feudal baron of Clare, Suffolk. He was succeeded by his son Walter I (d.1198) who was succeeded by his son Robert FitzWalter I (d.1235), founder of the family of FitzWalter, who left as heir a minor, his son Walter FitzWalter (1219–1258). Walter's son was Robert FitzWalter II (1247–1326). His son was Robert FitzWalter III (d.1328) who was succeeded by his son John FitzWalter (1315–1361).

Foundation of Priory
The Parish Church was founded in 1104 by Lady Juga Baynard, wife of Ralph Baynard. After her death her son Geoffrey Baynard founded in 1106 an Augustinian priory dedicated to St Mary. One of its canons served as curate to the parish. The majority of the original structure has been lost but the Lady chapel survives and became the east end of the choir of the large and stately Little Dunmow Priory church, now the Parish Church dedicated to St Mary the Virgin. It retains the magnificent columns and beautiful Gothic windows as evidence of its former grandeur. The monastic buildings stood to the southwest of the church but, along with much of the Priory, were razed to the ground after the Dissolution of the Monasteries, when the priory site, with the manors of Little Dunmow and Clopton Hall, were granted to the patron of the priory, Robert Radcliffe, 1st Earl of Sussex.

21st Century 
The building of a new development, Flitch Green, began in 2001. By 2008 the population of this development far exceeded that of the old village, and in April 2009 Flitch Green became a separate civil parish, under an order made by Uttlesford District Council, but retains Little Dunmow as its postal address. A further development, Chelmer Mead, was proposed in 2007. An original scope of 3,000 houses was shelved after opposition, and subsequent smaller proposals have been refused planning permission.

Notable buildings

Many 14th, 15th, 16th and 17th-century buildings may still be found in the village, including Priory Place (on the site of the old Priory), Brick House (beside the footpath to Barnston as it approaches the Chelmer valley), Ivy House (at the junction of The Street and Brook Street, Monks Hall (at the junction of The Street and Grange Lane) and Rose Farm (at the Junction of Grange Lane and the Street). A number of thatched cottages are scattered around the village. The centre of Little Dunmow has a defined conservation area.

Flitch Trials

Little Dunmow was the original home of the Flitch Trials which now take place in Great Dunmow every four years. The ancient Flitch of bacon custom rewarded a couple who had been married in church and remained "unregreted" for a year and a day, with a flitch of bacon. The claimants had to swear an oath kneeling on two sharp pointed stones in the churchyard. They were then carried through the village to be acclaimed. In later years they were carried in the Flitch Chair, thought to be made from pew ends from the priory church. The original kneeling stones and 15th-century chair can still be seen within the church.

The last recorded priory trial was held in 1751 but the custom was revived in Victorian times following the 1854 publication of the novel The Flitch of Bacon by William Harrison Ainsworth.

See also
 The Hundred Parishes

References

External links
 Little Dunmow Parish Council

Villages in Essex
Uttlesford